The 2007 Atlanta Braves season was the 42nd season in Atlanta and the 137th overall. They attempted to recapture the NL East title, which they had relinquished in 2006 for the first time since joining the division in 1994. They opened their season with a sweep of the Philadelphia Phillies.

Offseason

December
December 3: Signed RHP Tanyon Sturtze to a one-year deal. Sturtze, who had rotator cuff surgery on May 23, 2006, was expected to join the bullpen about a month after the season started.
December 7 : Traded LHP Horacio Ramírez to the Seattle Mariners in exchange for RHP Rafael Soriano. Ramirez, viewed by many within the organization as having great potential, had not lived up to expectations in Atlanta. With this trade, John Schuerholz showed he was going to be aggressive in upgrading the bullpen, a big part of the Braves' struggles in 2006. Soriano owned a 65/21 SO/BB ratio in 60 innings for the Mariners in 2006.
December 9: Signed OF Willie Harris to a minor league contract and invited him to spring training. At the time, it was assumed that Harris would either be a reserve outfielder in Atlanta or stay in Richmond the entire year. Few people, if any, foresaw the kind of production Harris would have with the Braves after earning playing time due to Ryan Langerhans' departure in a trade with the Oakland Athletics. Many of Harris' previous struggles can be attributed to his playing in the American League, which does not focus as much on "small ball" as the National League. Harris' talents, which center around his speed and his ability to hit for contact, have led him to become a valuable member of the club in 2007.
December 12 : Declined to tender 2007 contract offers to 2B Marcus Giles and RHP Chris Reitsma. Not having received any favorable trade offers for Marcus Giles, the Braves were forced to decline him arbitration, believing that their best option at second base for 2007 was Kelly Johnson, an outfielder in 2005 who did not play at all in 2006 due to Tommy John surgery. Despite many critics' claims that his defense would be abysmal, Johnson has played a fine second base and has proven to be one of the majors' best hitters at his position.
December 20 : Signed UTIL Chris Woodward to a one-year contract. Woodward was expected to be a "super-utility" player for the bench, as he had experience not only at each position in the infield, but had played in the outfield as well.

January
January 18 : Agreed to terms with OF/1B Craig Wilson on a one-year contract. Wilson was thought mainly to have been added as part of a platoon at first base with rookie Scott Thorman; Thorman is a left-handed batter, while Wilson bats right-handed. He was also available for use as an extra outfielder.
January 19 : Acquired LHP Mike González and nonroster SS Brent Lillibridge from the Pittsburgh Pirates in exchange for 1B Adam LaRoche and nonroster OF Jamie Romak. With Thorman as the heir apparent at first base for the Braves, Schuerholz continued the trend of strengthening the weak bullpen by trading for a reliever in González who, by all accounts, had been a shut-down closer for Pittsburgh in 2006. Notable statistics for González in that year: 64/31 SO/BB ratio, converted all 24 save opportunities, and allowed 1 home run in 54 innings. Lillibridge ranked #93 in Baseball America's Top 100 Prospects  list for the 2007 season.

March
March 9 : Agreed to terms with LHP Mark Redman on a one-year contract. Schuerholz decided to take a chance on free agent Redman, a former All-Star with the Kansas City Royals, to shore up the back end of the rotation.
March 22 : Signed C Brian McCann to a six-year contract with a club option for a seventh season. As is becoming the case ever more frequently with many major league clubs, the Braves opted to lock up a promising young player in McCann with a long-term deal to avoid both arbitration and free agency hassles.
March 23 : Acquired RHP Erik Cordier from the Royals in exchange for INF Tony Peña Jr. Peña was out of options in Atlanta, meaning that if he did not make the Braves' 25-man roster out of Spring training, he would have had to clear waivers to be assigned to the minor leagues. At that point, any other club would have had the opportunity to claim him off waivers. By acquiring Cordier, a once-highly regarded prospect before having Tommy John surgery, the Braves at least gained some value for Peña, who was not likely earn a spot on the 25-man roster.

Regular season

Season summary

April
The team had a great April to open the season, finishing the month with a 16–9 record. They also won both series against the rival Mets that month. Three of the four victories in those series were comeback wins. They were 2 games ahead of the Mets for first-place at the end of the month.

May
The Braves started off the month red-hot by winning 8 of their first 11 games, which included five straight wins from May 8–12. It was their first five-game winning streak since July 2006. The team finished out the month by winning just 6 of their final 17 games, however, which included a sweep at home at the hands of the Phillies (whom they had swept at the beginning of the season). The Braves ended with a .500 record for the month, at 14–14.

June
Interleague play during mid-June saw the Braves struggle, finishing with an NL-worst 4–11 record. The team lost 7 out of 8 games, including a stretch in which they scored just a single run in a five-game span. On June 24, the Braves fell to .500 for the first time during the season. The month ended on a positive note, however, as the Braves took five straight games from the Washington Nationals and the Florida Marlins. During those five games, the Braves scored 41 runs. The Braves finished the month four games behind the Mets in the divisional standings.

July
On July 5, Chipper Jones surpassed Dale Murphy for the Atlanta club record of 372 home runs by belting 2 against the Los Angeles Dodgers. The Braves went into the All-Star break with a record of 47–42, 2 games behind the New York Mets. After the break, the Braves swept the Pirates in three games, then were immediately swept by the last-place Cincinnati Reds.

On July 18, Julio Franco was signed as a free agent. On July 21, Willie Harris went 6-for-6 with 6 RBIs to become the seventh player in franchise history to go 6-for-6 in a 14–6 win over the St. Louis Cardinals.

On July 31, the Braves acquired 1B Mark Teixeira and LHP Ron Mahay from the Texas Rangers for C Jarrod Saltalamacchia, SS Elvis Andrus, LHP Matt Harrison, RHP Neftalí Feliz, and LHP Beau Jones. Saltalamacchia, Andrus, and Harrison were rated as the top three prospects in the organization at the start of the season by Baseball America. Later in the day, they acquired RHP Octavio Dotel from the Kansas City Royals for RHP Kyle Davies. In the final deal before the deadline, Atlanta traded LHPs Wilfredo Ledezma and Will Startup to the San Diego Padres for LHP Royce Ring.

August
The Braves went through a disappointing August going 13–15. They suffered a terrible loss on August 2 losing to the Houston Astros 12–11 in 14 innings in which Édgar Rentería left with an ankle sprain which kept him out for a month. Yunel Escobar took his spot and fared similarly to Rentería and on August 5, he hit a walk-off single against the Colorado Rockies in 10 innings. On August 16, Jeff Francoeur, wore a jersey with his name misspelled on it. The "e" and "u" in his name switched, went 0-for-4 with the Braves in a game against the Giants. At the end of the month, they were  games back of the Mets for first place.

September
After dropping the first two games of September to the rival New York Mets, the Braves won 14 of their next 20 games to pull within only three games of the wild card. The Braves could not keep up this blistering pace however, dropping four of their last five games, eliminating themselves from playoff contention. The Braves did use the late season roster expansion to bring up young OF prospect Brandon Jones, a possible replacement for outfielder Andruw Jones, whose contract expired in 2007, and won't be renewed because his batting statistics tumbled in 2007. The Braves final game of the season took place on September 30, and the Braves lost to the Houston Astros, 3–0. This was also the final Braves game broadcast nationally by TBS, ending more than 30 years of nationally televised Atlanta Braves baseball.

Postseason

October

On October 11, John Schuerholz gave up the GM job after 17 years to become team president, signing a four-year contract. The new GM Frank Wren, signed a four-year contract after eight years as Assistant GM.

Season standings

National League East

Record vs. opponents

Roster

Game log

! style="width:13%;"|TV
! style="width:13%;"|Radio
|- style="text-align:center; background:#bfb;"
|1||April 2||@ Phillies||5–3||Wickman (1–0)||Madson (0–1)||Paronto (1)||44,742||2:57||1–0||TBS||WGST/WUBL
|- style="text-align:center; background:#bfb;"
|2||April 4||@ Phillies||3–2||McBride (1–0)||Madson (0–2)||Wickman (1)||41,516||3:16||2–0||FSN South||WGST/WUBL
|- style="text-align:center; background:#bfb;"
|3||April 5||@ Phillies||8–4||James (1–0)||Eaton (0–1)||Soriano (1)||30,062||3:10||3–0||TBS||WGST/WUBL
|- style="text-align:center; background:#fbb;"
|4||April 6||Mets||1–11||Pérez (1–0)||Redman (0–1)||||51,014||2:59||3–1||TBS||WGST/WUBL
|- style="text-align:center; background:#bfb;"
|5||April 7||Mets||5–3||Smoltz (1–0)||Glavine (1–1)||Wickman (2)||43,156||3:13||4–1||FOX||WGST/WUBL
|- style="text-align:center; background:#bfb;"
|6||April 8||Mets||3–2||Soriano (1–0)||Heilman (0–1)||Wickman (3)||24,832||2:59||5–1||TBS||WGST/WUBL
|- style="text-align:center; background:#bfb;"
|7||April 10||Nationals||8–0||Hudson (1–0)||Chico (0–1)||||18,396||2:52||6–1||TBS||WGST/WUBL
|- style="text-align:center; background:#bfb;"
|8||April 11||Nationals||8–3||James (2–0)||Williams (0–2)||||15,631||2:47||7–1||FSN South||WGST/WUBL
|- style="text-align:center; background:#fbb;"
|9||April 12||Nationals||0–2||Colomé (1–0)||Smoltz (1–1)||Cordero (1)||23,897||2:42||7–2||TBS||WGST/WUBL
|- style="text-align:center; background:#fbb;"
|10||April 13||Marlins||4–11||Willis (3–0)||Redman (0–2)||||33,212||2:52||7–3||TBS||WGST/WUBL
|- style="text-align:center; background:#bbb;"
|–||April 14||Marlins||colspan=6|Rescheduled for June 5||7–3||colspan=2|
|- style="text-align:center; background:#bfb;"
|12||April 15||Marlins||8–4||Hudson (2–0)||Olsen (2–1)||||25,189||2:57||8–3||TBS||WGST/WUBL
|- style="text-align:center; background:#fbb;"
|13||April 16||@ Nationals||1–5||Chico (1–1)||James (2–1)||||16,316||2:35||8–4||SportSouth||WGST/WUBL
|- style="text-align:center; background:#bfb;"
|14||April 17||@ Nationals||6–4||Smoltz (2–1)||Williams (0–3)||Wickman (4)||17,791||3:10||9–4||SportSouth||WGST/WUBL
|- style="text-align:center; background:#bfb;"
|15||April 18||Cubs||8–6||Villarreal (1–0)||Eyre (0–1)||Wickman (5)||26,837||3:09||10–4||FSN South||WGST/WUBL
|- style="text-align:center; background:#fbb;"
|16||April 19||Cubs||0–3||Hill (3–0)||Redman (0–3)||Dempster (3)||31,603||2:27||10–5||TBS||WGST/WUBL
|- style="text-align:center; background:#bfb;"
|17||April 20||@ Mets||7–3||Hudson (3–0)||Pelfrey (0–1)||||47,547||2:55||11–5||TBS||WGST/WUBL
|- style="text-align:center; background:#fbb;"
|18||April 21||@ Mets||2–7||Pérez (2–1)||James (2–2)||||55,143||2:48||11–6||SportSouth||WGST/WUBL
|- style="text-align:center; background:#bfb;"
|19||April 22||@ Mets||9–6||Yates (1–0)||Heilman (1–2)||Wickman (6)||55,671||3:21||12–6||TBS||WGST/WUBL
|- style="text-align:center; background:#fbb;"
|20||April 23||@ Marlins||7–8||Willis (4–1)||Davies (0–1)||Pinto (1)||13,227||2:48||12–7||SportSouth||WGST/WUBL
|- style="text-align:center; background:#bfb;"
|21||April 24||@ Marlins||11–6||Moylan (1–0)||Lindstrom (0–1)||||11,507||3:09||13–7||TBS||WGST/WUBL
|- style="text-align:center; background:#fbb;"
|22||April 25||@ Marlins||3–4||Owens (1–0)||Wickman (1–1)||||13,310||2:23||13–8||FSN South||WGST/WUBL
|- style="text-align:center; background:#bfb;"
|23||April 27||@ Rockies||9–7||James (3–2)||Francis (1–3)||Moylan (1)||25,079||3:09||14–8||TBS||WGST/WUBL
|- style="text-align:center; background:#bfb;"
|24||April 28||@ Rockies||6–2||Smoltz (3–1)||Hirsh (2–2)||||28,178||2:29||15–8||TBS||WGST/WUBL
|- style="text-align:center; background:#fbb;"
|25||April 29||@ Rockies||7–9||Bautista (1–0)||Colyer (0–1)||||31,445||3:40||15–9||TBS||WGST/WUBL
|- style="text-align:center; background:#bfb;"
|26||April 30||Phillies||5–2||González (1–0)||Alfonseca (1–1)||||20,354||2:24||16–9||SportSouth||WGST/WUBL

! style="width:13%;"|TV
! style="width:13%;"|Radio
|- style="text-align:center; background:#fbb;"
|27||May 1||Phillies||4–6||Hamels (3–1)||Redman (0–4)||Gordon (5)||19,670||3:18||16–10||FSN South||WGST/WUBL
|- style="text-align:center; background:#bfb;"
|28||May 2||Phillies||4–3||Paronto (1–0)||García (1–2)||Soriano (2)||23,647||2:49||17–10||FSN South||WGST/WUBL
|- style="text-align:center; background:#bfb;"
|29||May 4||Dodgers||4–0||Smoltz (4–1)||Tomko (0–3)||||38,263||2:39||18–10||TBS||WGST/WUBL
|- style="text-align:center; background:#fbb;"
|30||May 5||Dodgers||3–6||Lowe (3–3)||Hudson (3–1)||Saito (9)||42,786||2:51||18–11||TBS||WGST/WUBL
|- style="text-align:center; background:#bfb;"
|31||May 6||Dodgers||6–4||Paronto (2–0)||Tsao (0–1)||González (1)||33,350||2:57||18–12||TBS||WGST/WUBL
|- style="text-align:center; background:#fbb;"
|32||May 7||Padres||2–4||Young (4–2)||James (3–3)||Hoffman (9)||19,189||3:00||19–12||SportSouth||WGST/WUBL
|- style="text-align:center; background:#bfb;"
|33||May 8||Padres||3–2||González (2–0)||Bell (0–1)||Soriano (3)||21,748||2:13||20–12||SportSouth||WGST/WUBL
|- style="text-align:center; background:#bfb;"
|34||May 9||Padres||3–2||Smoltz (5–1)||Meredith (1–1)||Soriano (4)||36,523||2:13||21–12||FSN South||WGST/WUBL
|- style="text-align:center; background:#bfb;"
|35||May 10||Padres||5–3||Hudson (4–1)||Wells (1–2)||Soriano (5)||28,799||2:39||22–12||TBS||WGST/WUBL
|- style="text-align:center; background:#bfb;"
|36||May 11||@ Pirates||4–1||Davies (1–1)||Duke (1–4)||González (2)||23,376||2:35||23–12||TBS||WGST/WUBL
|- style="text-align:center; background:#bfb;"
|37||May 12||@ Pirates||9–2||James (4–3)||Armas (0–3)||||34,775||2:19||24–12||SportSouth||WGST/WUBL
|- style="text-align:center; background:#fbb;"
|38||May 13||@ Pirates||2–13||Snell (3–2)||Lerew (0–1)||||19,484||2:45||24–13||TBS||WGST/WUBL
|- style="text-align:center; background:#fbb;"
|39||May 14||@ Nationals||1–2||Bergmann (1–3)||Smoltz (5–2)||Colomé (1)||18,829||2:08||24–14||SportSouth||WGST/WUBL
|- style="text-align:center; background:#bfb;"
|40||May 15||@ Nationals||6–2||Hudson (5–1)||Williams (0–5)||||21,258||2:40||25–14||SportSouth||WGST/WUBL
|- style="text-align:center; background:#fbb;"
|41||May 16||@ Nationals||4–6||Traber (1–0)||Davies (1–2)||Rauch (2)||20,329||2:29||25–15||FSN South||WGST/WUBL
|- style="text-align:center; background:#fbb;"
|42||May 17||@ Nationals||3–4||Chico (3–4)||Paronto (2–1)||Rauch (3)||24,631||2:36||25–16||TBS||WGST/WUBL
|- style="text-align:center; background:#bbb;"
|–||May 18||@ Red Sox||colspan=6|Rescheduled for May 19||25–16||colspan=2|
|- style="text-align:center; background:#fbb;"
|43||May 19||@ Red Sox||3–13||Matsuzaka (6–2)||Lerew (0–2)||||36,358||3:02||25–17||SportSouth||WGST/WUBL
|- style="text-align:center; background:#bfb;"
|44||May 19||@ Red Sox||14–0||Smoltz (6–2)||Hansack (0–1)||||36,792||3:01||26–17||SportSouth||WGST/WUBL
|- style="text-align:center; background:#fbb;"
|45||May 20||@ Red Sox||3–6||Gabbard (1–0)||Hudson (5–2)||||36,140||3:05||26–18||TBS||WGST/WUBL
|- style="text-align:center; background:#bfb;"
|46||May 22||Mets||8–1||Davies (2–2)||Sosa (3–1)||||32,587||2:29||27–18||TBS||WGST/WUBL
|- style="text-align:center; background:#fbb;"
|47||May 23||Mets||0–3||Pérez (6–3)||James (4–4)||Wagner (11)||30,489||2:49||27–19||TBS||WGST/WUBL
|- style="text-align:center; background:#bfb;"
|48||May 24||Mets||2–1||Smoltz (7–2)||Glavine (5–2)||Wickman (7)||36,660||2:33||28–19||TBS||WGST/WUBL
|- style="text-align:center; background:#fbb;"
|49||May 25||Phillies||3–8||Moyer (5–3)||Hudson (5–3)||||35,402||2:58||28–19||SportSouth||WGST/WUBL
|- style="text-align:center; background:#fbb;"
|50||May 26||Phillies||4–6||Eaton (5–3)||Carlyle (0–1)||Alfonseca (1)||40,122||2:51||28–20||FOX||WGST/WUBL
|- style="text-align:center; background:#fbb;"
|51||May 27||Phillies||6–13||Hamels (7–2)||Davies (2–3)||||38,058||3:05||28–21||TBS||WGST/WUBL
|- style="text-align:center; background:#bfb;"
|52||May 28||@ Brewers||2–1||James (5–4)||Capuano (5–4)||Wickman (8)||41,139||2:37||29–21||TBS||WGST/WUBL
|- style="text-align:center; background:#fbb;"
|53||May 29||@ Brewers||4–5||Sheets (5–3)||Moylan (1–1)||Cordero (18)||27,559||3:01||29–22||FSN South||WGST/WUBL
|- style="text-align:center; background:#bfb;"
|54||May 30||@ Brewers||9–3||Hudson (6–3)||Turnbow (1–3)||||32,758||2:44||30–22||TBS||WGST/WUBL

! style="width:13%;"|TV
! style="width:13%;"|Radio
|- style="text-align:center; background:#bfb;"
|55||June 1||@ Cubs||8–5||Davies (3–3)||Zambrano (5–5)||||39,523||2:58||31–22||TBS||WGST/WUBL
|- style="text-align:center; background:#bfb;"
|56||June 2||@ Cubs||5–3||Yates (2–0)||Ohman (0–3)||Wickman (9)||40,290||2:40||32–22||SportSouth||WGST/WUBL
|- style="text-align:center; background:#fbb;"
|57||June 3||@ Cubs||1–10||Marshall (1–2)||Cormier (0–1)||||40,155||2:36||32–23||TBS||WGST/WUBL
|- style="text-align:center; background:#fbb;"
|58||June 4||Marlins||4–6||Obermueller (2–3)||Hudson (6–4)||Gregg (8)||22,175||2:44||32–24||SportSouth||WGST/WUBL
|- style="text-align:center; background:#bfb;"
|11||June 5||Marlins||3–1||Carlyle (1–1)||Pinto (0–3)||Wickman (10)||20,863||2:20||33–24||SportSouth||WGST/WUBL
|- style="text-align:center; background:#fbb;"
|59||June 5||Marlins||1–5||VandenHurk (1–1)||Smoltz (7–3)||||27,072||2:27||33–25||SportSouth||WGST/WUBL
|- style="text-align:center; background:#fbb;"
|60||June 6||Marlins||4–7||Miller (1–0)||Davies (3–4)||Gregg (9)||28,026||3:10||33–26||FSN South||WGST/WUBL
|- style="text-align:center; background:#fbb;"
|61||June 7||Cubs||1–2||Hill (5–4)||James (5–5)||Dempster (12)||32,902||2:14||33–27||SportSouth||WGST/WUBL
|- style="text-align:center; background:#fbb;"
|62||June 8||Cubs||1–9||Marshall (2–2)||Cormier (0–2)||||37,123||2:58||33–28||TBS||WGST/WUBL
|- style="text-align:center; background:#bfb;"
|63||June 9||Cubs||9–5||Moylan (2–1)||Marquis (5–3)||||51,816||3:09||34–28||SportSouth||WGST/WUBL
|- style="text-align:center; background:#bfb;"
|64||June 10||Cubs||5–4||Paronto (3–1)||Dempster (1–3)||Wickman (11)||32,752||3:05||35–28||ESPN||WGST/WUBL
|- style="text-align:center; background:#fbb;"
|65||June 12||@ Twins||3–7||Slowey (2–0)||Davies (3–5)||||25,868||2:39||35–29||SportSouth||WGST/WUBL
|- style="text-align:center; background:#fbb;"
|66||June 13||@ Twins||0–6||Silva (4–7)||James (5–6)||||27,903||2:10||35–30||FSN South||WGST/WUBL
|- style="text-align:center; background:#fbb;"
|67||June 14||@ Twins||2–3||Reyes (1–1)||Wickman (1–2)||||26,714||2:35||35–31||TBS||WGST/WUBL
|- style="text-align:center; background:#bfb;"
|68||June 15||@ Indians||5–4||Soriano (2–0)||Sabathia (9–2)||Wickman (12)||34,848||2:58||36–31||SportSouth||WGST/WUBL
|- style="text-align:center; background:#bfb;"
|69||June 16||@ Indians||6–2||Smoltz (8–3)||Byrd (6–3)||||35,153||2:48||37–31||FOX||WGST/WBL
|- style="text-align:center; background:#fbb;"
|70||June 17||@ Indians||2–5||Carmona (8–2)||Davies (3–6)||Borowski (20)||33,429||2:51||37–32||TBS||WGST/WUBL
|- style="text-align:center; background:#bfb;"
|71||June 18||Red Sox||9–4||James (6–6)||Schilling (6–4)||||47,562||3:11||38–32||ESPN||WGST/WUBL
|- style="text-align:center; background:#fbb;"
|72||June 19||Red Sox||0–4||Beckett (10–1)||Hudson (6–5)||||47,910||2:57||38–33||SportSouth||WGST/WUBL
|- style="text-align:center; background:#fbb;"
|73||June 20||Red Sox||0–11||Tavárez (5–4)||Carlyle (1–2)||||49,585||2:46||38–34||FSN South||WGST/WUBL
|- style="text-align:center; background:#fbb;"
|74||June 22||Tigers||0–5||Rogers (1–0)||Smoltz (8–4)||||44,034||2:37||38–35||SportSouth||WGST/WUBL
|- style="text-align:center; background:#fbb;"
|75||June 23||Tigers||1–2||Verlander (8–2)||Davies (3–7)||Jones (18)||49,074||2:51||38–36||FOX||WGST/WUBL
|- style="text-align:center; background:#fbb;"
|76||June 24||Tigers||0–5||Miller (3–1)||James (6–7)||Durbin (1)||34,181||2:52||38–37||ESPN||WGST/WUBL
|- style="text-align:center; background:#bfb;"
|77||June 25||Nationals||4–1||Hudson (7–5)||Bergmann (1–4)||Wickman (13)||25,375||2:29||39–38||SportSouth||WGST/WUBL
|- style="text-align:center; background:#bfb;"
|78||June 26||Nationals||6–2||Carlyle (2–2)||Bacsik (1–5)||Wickman (14)||22,508||2:39||40–38||SportSouth||WGST/WUBL
|- style="text-align:center; background:#bfb;"
|79||June 27||Nationals||13–0||Smoltz (9–4)||Bowie (4–3)||||29,144||3:08||41–38||FSN South||WGST/WUBL
|- style="text-align:center; background:#bfb;"
|80||June 29||@ Marlins||12–3||James (7–7)||Johnson (0–3)||||17,181||3:16||42–38||SportSouth||WGST/WUBL
|- style="text-align:center; background:#bfb;"
|81||June 30||@ Marlins||6–5||Hudson (8–5)||Benítez (2–4)||Yates (1)||24,229||3:25||43–38||TBS||WGST/WUBL

! style="width:13%;"|TV
! style="width:13%;"|Radio
|- style="text-align:center; background:#fbb;"
|82||July 1||@ Marlins||5–6||Gardner (2–2)||Soriano (2–1)||||14,311||3:17||43–39||TBS||WGST/WUBL
|- style="text-align:center; background:#fbb;"
|83||July 2||@ Dodgers||2–8||Beimel (2–1)||Smoltz (9–5)||||40,571||3:03||43–40||SportSouth||WGST/WUBL
|- style="text-align:center; background:#fbb;"
|84||July 3||@ Dodgers||6–7||Seánez (5–1)||Ledezma (0–1)||Saito (23)||43,052||2:50||43–41||TBS||WGST/WUBL
|- style="text-align:center; background:#bfb;"
|85||July 4||@ Dodgers||5–2||James (8–7)||Hendrickson (2–4)||Wickman (15)||56,000||3:08||44–41||FSN South||WGST/WUBL
|- style="text-align:center; background:#bfb;"
|86||July 5||@ Dodgers||8–6||Moylan (3–1)||Stults (0–1)||Wickman (16)||41,052||3:28||45–41||TBS||WGST/WUBL
|- style="text-align:center; background:#bfb;"
|87||July 6||@ Padres||7–4||Carlyle (3–2)||Germano (5–3)||||37,526||2:36||46–41||TBS||WGST/WUBL
|- style="text-align:center; background:#fbb;"
|88||July 7||@ Padres||5–8||Bell (3–2)||Yates (2–1)||Hoffman (25)||41,419||2:52||46–42||FOX||WGST/WUBL
|- style="text-align:center; background:#bfb;"
|89||July 8||@ Padres||5–4||Davies (4–7)||Maddux (7–6)||||41,026||2:34||47–42||ESPN||WGST/WUBL
|- style="text-align:center; background:khaki;"
|–||July 10||colspan=10|2007 Major League Baseball All-Star Game in San Francisco, California
|- style="text-align:center; background:#bfb;"
|90||July 13||Pirates||9–1||Hudson (9–5)||Snell (7–6)||||38,922||2:28||48–42||TBS||WGST/WUBL
|- style="text-align:center; background:#bfb;"
|91||July 14||Pirates||5–4||Wickman (2–2)||Chacón (4–2)||||44,041||2:54||49–42||SportSouth||WGST/WUBL
|- style="text-align:center; background:#bfb;"
|92||July 15||Pirates||5–1||Carlyle (4–2)||Maholm (5–12)||||30,756||2:17||50–42||TBS||WGST/WUBL
|- style="text-align:center; background:#fbb;"
|93||July 16||Reds||3–10||Livingston (2–0)||Davies (4–8)||||24,442||3:16||50–43||SportSouth||WGST/WUBL
|- style="text-align:center; background:#fbb;"
|94||July 17||Reds||5–6||Arroyo (4–10)||Reyes (0–1)||Weathers (18)||30,072||2:39||50–44||SportSouth||WGST/WUBL
|- style="text-align:center; background:#fbb;"
|95||July 18||Reds||4–5||Gosling (1–0)||Ascanio (0–1)||||33,789||4:31||50–45||TBS||WGST/WUBL
|- style="text-align:center; background:#bfb;"
|96||July 19||Cardinals||10–1||Hudson (10–5)||Maroth (5–5)||||41,171||2:32||51–45||FSN South||WGST/WUBL
|- style="text-align:center; background:#fbb;"
|97||July 20||Cardinals||2–4||Wainwright (9–7)||Soriano (2–2)||Isringhausen (19)||42,712||2:39||51–46||FSN South||WGST/WUBL
|- style="text-align:center; background:#bfb;"
|98||July 21||Cardinals||14–6||Carlyle (5–2)||Looper (7–8)||||53,953||3:22||52–46||SportSouth||WGST/WUBL
|- style="text-align:center; background:#fbb;"
|99||July 22||Cardinals||2–7||Isringhausen (4–0)||Yates (2–2)||||39,181||3:25||52–47||ESPN||WGST/WUBL
|- style="text-align:center; background:#bfb;"
|100||July 23||@ Giants||4–2||Smoltz (10–5)||Cain (3–12)||Wickman (17)||42,679||2:40||53–47||SportSouth||WGST/WUBL
|- style="text-align:center; background:#bfb;"
|101||July 24||@ Giants||7–5||Moylan (4–1)||Sánchez (1–2)||Yates (2)||43,072||4:08||54–47||TBS||WGST/WUBL
|- style="text-align:center; background:#fbb;"
|102||July 25||@ Giants||1–2||Lowry (11–7)||James (8–8)||Hennessey (7)||42,834||2:27||54–48||TBS||WGST/WUBL
|- style="text-align:center; background:#fbb;"
|103||July 26||@ Giants||2–4||Lincecum (6–2)||Carlyle (5–3)||Hennessey (8)||42,366||2:33||54–49||TBS||WGST/WUBL
|- style="text-align:center; background:#fbb;"
|104||July 27||@ D-backs||7–8||González (4–2)||Ledezma (0–2)||||27,151||3:40||54–50||TBS||WGST/WUBL
|- style="text-align:center; background:#fbb;"
|105||July 28||@ D-backs||3–4||Cruz (5–1)||Yates (2–3)||||33,664||3:08||54–51||FOX||WGST/WUBL
|- style="text-align:center; background:#bfb;"
|106||July 29||@ D-backs||14–0||Hudson (11–5)||Hernández (6–7)||||30,535||2:34||55–51||TBS||WGST/WUBL
|- style="text-align:center; background:#bfb;"
|107||July 31||Astros||12–4||James (9–8)||Sampson (7–8)||||32,315||2:41||56–51||SportSouth||WGST/WUBL

! style="width:13%;"|TV
! style="width:13%;"|Radio
|- style="text-align:center; background:#bfb;"
|108||August 1||Astros||12–3||Carlyle (6–3)||Rodríguez (7–10)||||30,785||2:52||57–51||FSN South||WGST/WUBL
|- style="text-align:center; background:#fbb;"
|109||August 2||Astros||11–12||McLemore (1–0)||Villarreal (1–1)||Moehler (1)||35,659||4:59||57–52||TBS||WGST/WUBL
|- style="text-align:center; background:#fbb;"
|110||August 3||Rockies||2–9||Francis (12–5)||Smoltz (10–6)||||37,481||2:59||57–53||TBS||WGST/WUBL
|- style="text-align:center; background:#bfb;"
|111||August 4||Rockies||6–4||Hudson (12–5)||Jiménez (1–1)||Wickman (18)||50,647||3:02||58–53||SportSouth||WGST/WUBL
|- style="text-align:center; background:#bfb;"
|112||August 5||Rockies||6–5||Villarreal (2–1)||Buchholz (5–4)||||37,089||3:28||59–53||TBS||WGST/WUBL
|- style="text-align:center; background:#bfb;"
|113||August 7||@ Mets||7–3||Carlyle (7–3)||Pérez (10–8)||||52,177||2:45||60–53||SportSouth||WGST/WUBL
|- style="text-align:center; background:#fbb;"
|114||August 8||@ Mets||3–4||Heilman (7–3)||Soriano (2–3)||Wagner (26)||51,749||2:48||60–54||FSN South||WGST/WUBL
|- style="text-align:center; background:#bfb;"
|115||August 9||@ Mets||7–6||Hudson (13–5)||Maine (12–7)||Villarreal (1)||52,425||3:12||61–54||TBS||WGST/WUBL
|- style="text-align:center; background:#fbb;"
|116||August 10||@ Phillies||4–5||Hamels (13–5)||Moylan (4–2)||Gordon (6)||40,844||2:24||61–55||TBS||WGST/WUBL
|- style="text-align:center; background:#bfb;"
|117||August 11||@ Phillies||7–5||Mahay (1–0)||Eaton (9–8)||Wickman (19)||44,948||2:56||62–55||SportSouth||WGST/WUBL
|- style="text-align:center; background:#fbb;"
|118||August 12||@ Phillies||3–5||Moyer (11–8)||Carlyle (7–4)||Myers (9)||45,053||2:38||62–56||ESPN||WGST/WUBL
|- style="text-align:center; background:#bfb;"
|119||August 14||Giants||5–4||Wickman (3–2)||Kline (0–2)||||36,186||3:00||63–56||SportSouth||WGST/WUBL
|- style="text-align:center; background:#bfb;"
|120||August 15||Giants||6–3||Hudson (14–5)||Ortiz (2–3)||Wickman (20)||33,841||2:45||64–56||FSN South||WGST/WUBL
|- style="text-align:center; background:#fbb;"
|121||August 16||Giants||3–9||Lincecum (7–3)||James (9–9)||||36,419||2:31||64–57||TBS||WGST/WUBL
|- style="text-align:center; background:#fbb;"
|122||August 17||D-backs||0–4||Webb (13–8)||Cormier (0–3)||||33,248||2:17||64–58||SportSouth||WGST/WUBL
|- style="text-align:center; background:#fbb;"
|123||August 18||D-backs||6–12||Owings (6–6)||Carlyle (7–5)||||48,643||2:41||64–59||SportSouth||WGST/WUBL
|- style="text-align:center; background:#bfb;"
|124||August 19||D-backs||6–2||Smoltz (11–6)||Petit (2–4)||||30,818||2:53||65–59||TBS||WGST/WUBL
|- style="text-align:center; background:#bfb;"
|125||August 20||@ Reds||14–4||Hudson (15–5)||Dumatrait (0–2)||||24,477||2:50||66–59||SportSouth||WGST/WUBL
|- style="text-align:center; background:#fbb;"
|126||August 21||@ Reds||7–8||Bray (3–0)||Moylan (4–3)||Weathers (26)||21,039||2:40||66–60||SportSouth||WGST/WUBL
|- style="text-align:center; background:#fbb;"
|127||August 22||@ Reds||2–4||Arroyo (7–13)||Cormier (0–4)||Weathers (27)||22,924||2:36||66–61||FSN South||WGST/WUBL
|- style="text-align:center; background:#fbb;"
|128||August 23||@ Reds||7–9||Gosling (2–0)||Wickman (3–3)||||22,052||3:46||66–62||SportSouth||WGST/WUBL
|- style="text-align:center; background:#bfb;"
|129||August 24||@ Cardinals||7–2||Smoltz (12–6)||Wells (6–14)||||44,032||2:53||67–62||SportSouth||WGST/WUBL
|- style="text-align:center; background:#fbb;"
|130||August 25||@ Cardinals||4–5||Springer (7–1)||Hudson (15–6)||Isringhausen (26)||45,441||2:57||67–63||SportSouth||WGST/WUBL
|- style="text-align:center; background:#fbb;"
|131||August 26||@ Cardinals||1–4||Wainwright (12–9)||Reyes (0–2)||Isringhausen (27)||43,934||2:27||67–64||TBS||WGST/WUBL
|- style="text-align:center; background:#bfb;"
|132||August 27||@ Marlins||13–2||Cormier (1–4)||Olsen (9–12)||||11,716||2:39||68–64||SportSouth||WGST/WUBL
|- style="text-align:center; background:#fbb;"
|133||August 28||@ Marlins||3–4||Kim (7–6)||Villarreal (2–2)||||11,539||3:12||68–65||SportSouth||WGST/WUBL
|- style="text-align:center; background:#bfb;"
|134||August 29||@ Marlins||7–4||Carlyle (8–5)||Willis (8–14)||Soriano (6)||12,633||2:52||69–65||FSN South||WGST/WUBL
|- style="text-align:center; background:#fbb;"
|135||August 31||Mets||1–7||Maine (14–8)||Hudson (15–7)||||45,245||2:32||69–66||SportSouth||WGST/WUBL

! style="width:13%;"|TV
! style="width:13%;"|Radio
|- style="text-align:center; background:#fbb;"
|136||September 1||Mets||1–5||Pelfrey (1–7)||James (9–10)||Feliciano (2)||45,611||2:29||69–67||FOX||WGST/WUBL
|- style="text-align:center; background:#fbb;"
|137||September 2||Mets||2–3||Glavine (12–6)||Smoltz (12–7)||Wagner (30)||46,242||2:47||69–68||TBS||WGST/WUBL
|- style="text-align:center; background:#bfb;"
|138||September 3||Phillies||5–1||Cormier (2–4)||Moyer (12–11)||||31,592||2:51||70–68||TBS||WGST/WUBL
|- style="text-align:center; background:#fbb;"
|139||September 4||Phillies||2–5||Lohse (8–12)||Carlyle (8–6)||Myers (14)||22,130||2:57||70–69||SportSouth||WGST/WUBL
|- style="text-align:center; background:#bfb;"
|140||September 5||Phillies||9–8||Soriano (3–3)||Myers (3–6)||||22,115||3:46||71–69||TBS||WGST/WUBL
|- style="text-align:center; background:#bfb;"
|141||September 7||Nationals||7–1||Smoltz (13–7)||Hanrahan (4–2)||||31,116||2:49||72–69||FSN South||WGST/WUBL
|- style="text-align:center; background:#bfb;"
|142||September 8||Nationals||9–2||James (10–10)||Chico (5–8)||||36,940||2:45||73–69||TBS||WGST/WUBL
|- style="text-align:center; background:#fbb;"
|143||September 9||Nationals||4–7||Bergmann (4–5)||Cormier (2–5)||Cordero (32)||31,582||2:59||73–70||TBS||WGST/WUBL
|- style="text-align:center; background:#fbb;"
|144||September 10||@ Mets||2–3||Pérez (14–9)||Hudson (15–8)||Wagner (33)||48,557||2:36||73–71||SportSouth||WGST/WUBL
|- style="text-align:center; background:#bfb;"
|145||September 11||@ Mets||13–5||Moylan (5–3)||Hernández (9–5)||||48,732||3:03||74–71||SportSouth||WGST/WUBL
|- style="text-align:center; background:#fbb;"
|146||September 12||@ Mets||3–4||Mota (2–1)||Acosta (0–1)||Wagner (34)||51,648||2:54||74–72||FSN South||WGST/WUBL
|- style="text-align:center; background:#bfb;"
|147||September 14||@ Nationals||8–5||Ascanio (1–1)||Colomé (4–1)||||18,568||5:13||75–72||SportSouth||WGST/WUBL
|- style="text-align:center; background:#fbb;"
|148||September 15||@ Nationals||4–7||Bergmann (5–5)||Cormier (2–6)||Cordero (34)||26,866||2:51||75–73||TBS||WGST/WUBL
|- style="text-align:center; background:#bfb;"
|149||September 16||@ Nationals||3–0||Hudson (16–8)||Hill (4–4)||||23,935||2:24||76–73||TBS||WGST/WUBL
|- style="text-align:center; background:#bfb;"
|150||September 17||Marlins||11–6||Smoltz (14–7)||Kim (9–7)||||20,957||2:51||77–73||SportSouth||WGST/WUBL
|- style="text-align:center; background:#bfb;"
|151||September 18||Marlins||4–3||Reyes (1–2)||Seddon (0–1)||Soriano (7)||22,076||3:10||78–73||SportSouth||WGST/WUBL
|- style="text-align:center; background:#bfb;"
|152||September 19||Marlins||5–1||James (11–10)||Barone (1–3)||||24,449||2:23||79–73||FSN South||WGST/WUBL
|- style="text-align:center; background:#bfb;"
|153||September 20||Brewers||3–1||Bennett (1–0)||Suppan (10–12)||Soriano (8)||26,595||2:38||80–73||SportSouth||WGST/WUBL
|- style="text-align:center; background:#fbb;"
|154||September 21||Brewers||1–4||Linebrink (5–6)||T. Hudson (16–9)||F. Cordero (44)||34,401||3:02||80–74||SportSouth||WGST/WUBL
|- style="text-align:center; background:#bfb;"
|155||September 22||Brewers||4–3||Devine (1–0)||McClung (0–1)||||42,378||3:28||81–74||FOX||WGST/WUBL
|- style="text-align:center; background:#bfb;"
|156||September 23||Brewers||7–4||Acosta (1–1)||Vargas (11–5)||Soriano (9)||44,088||3:34||82–74||TBS||WGST/WUBL
|- style="text-align:center; background:#bfb;"
|157||September 25||@ Phillies||10–6||Bennett (2–0)||Moyer (13–12)||||39,129||3:09||83–74||SportSouth||WGST/WUBL
|- style="text-align:center; background:#fbb;"
|158||September 26||@ Phillies||2–5||Lohse (9–12)||Hudson (16–10)||Myers (20)||36,588||2:32||83–75||SportSouth||WGST/WUBL
|- style="text-align:center; background:#fbb;"
|159||September 27||@ Phillies||4–6||Kendrick (10–4)||Smoltz (14–8)||Myers (21)||40,589||2:34||83–76||SportSouth||WGST/WUBL
|- style="text-align:center; background:#bfb;"
|160||September 28||@ Astros||7–2||Reyes (2–2)||Albers (4–11)||||43,011||3:00||84–76||SportSouth||WGST/WUBL
|- style="text-align:center; background:#fbb;"
|161||September 29||@ Astros||2–3||Backe (3–1)||Bennett (2–1)||Lidge (19)||43,624||2:35||84–77||SportSouth||WGST/WUBL
|- style="text-align:center; background:#fbb;"
|162||September 30||@ Astros||0–3||Paulino (2–1)||Carlyle (8–7)||Borkowski (1)||43,823||2:25||84–78||TBS||WGST/WUBL

|-
|

Player Stats

Batting
Note: PA=Plate appearances; HR=Home runs; RBI=Runs batted in; SB=Stolen bases; AVG=Batting average; OBP=On-base percentage; SLG=Slugging percentage.

*With Atlanta.

Pitching
Note: G=Games pitched; GS=Games started; W=Wins; L=Losses; IP=Innings pitched; H/9=Hits per 9 IP; BB/9=Walks per 9 IP; SO/9=Strikeouts per 9 IP; ERA=Earned run average

Farm system

LEAGUE CHAMPIONS: Richmond

References

Game Logs:
1st Half: Atlanta Braves Game Log on ESPN.com
2nd Half: Atlanta Braves Game Log on ESPN.com
Batting Statistics: Atlanta Braves Batting Stats on ESPN.com
Pitching Statistics: Atlanta Braves Pitching Stats on ESPN.com
Batting and Pitching Statistics: Atlanta Braves Statistics on BaseballProspectus.com

2007 Atlanta Braves at Baseball Reference

Atlanta Braves seasons
Atlanta Braves
Atlanta